Walentynów may refer to the following places:
Walentynów, Poddębice County in Łódź Voivodeship (central Poland)
Walentynów, Lubartów County in Lublin Voivodeship (east Poland)
Walentynów, Lublin County in Lublin Voivodeship (east Poland)
Walentynów, Tomaszów Mazowiecki County in Łódź Voivodeship (central Poland)
Walentynów, Lipsko County in Masovian Voivodeship (east-central Poland)
Walentynów, Radom County in Masovian Voivodeship (east-central Poland)
Walentynów, Greater Poland Voivodeship (west-central Poland)

See also 

 Valentinov, a surname